Generalbezirk Weissruthenien (General District White Ruthenia) was one of the four administrative subdivisions of Reichskommissariat Ostland, the 1941–1945 civilian occupation regime established by Nazi Germany for the administration of the three Baltic countries (Estonia, Latvia and Lithuania) and the western part of the Byelorussian SSR.

Organization and Structure
Generalbezirk Weissruthenien was formally organized on 1 September 1941 on the territory of German-occupied Byelorussia, (including West Belarus, previously Wilno and Nowogródek regions of the eastern territories of Poland annexed by the Soviet Union) which had until then been under the military administration of the Wehrmacht's Army Group Centre. The capital of Generalbezirk Weissruthenien was Minsk. On 1 April 1944, Generalbezirk Weißruthenien was detached from Reichskommissariat Ostland and was subordinated directly to the Reich Ministry for the Occupied Eastern Territories.

Administrative divisions 

Generalbezirk Weissruthenien was subdivided into Gebiete (areas). According to different sources, it had from as few as 9 to as many as 39 such subdivisions, some of them planned but never transitioned from military to civilian administration. These were to be subordinated to four or five Hauptgebiete (main areas) headquartered in Baranowitschi, Minsk, Mogilew, Witebsk, and possibly Smolensk.

Civil and Police Leadership 
Civil administration was led by a Generalkommissar (General Commissioner) directly appointed by Adolf Hitler, and who reported to Ostland Reichskommissar Hinrich Lohse, headquartered in Riga. In addition, police and security matters were overseen by an SS and Police Leader (SSPF) directly appointed by Reichsführer-SS Heinrich Himmler, and who reported to the Higher SS and Police Leader (HSSPF) Ostland und Russland-Nord in Riga, SS-Gruppenführer Hans-Adolf Prützmann until 1 November 1941, and SS-Obergruppenführer Friedrich Jeckeln until 1 April 1943. At that point, jurisdiction was transferred to the HSSPF "Russland Mitte" (Central Russia) headed by SS-Obergruppenführer Erich von dem Bach-Zelewski until 21 June 1944, and SS-Gruppenführer Curt von Gottberg from that date forward.

Generalkommissar: Wilhelm Kube (17 July 1941 – 22 September 1943). On 22 September 1943, Kube was assassinated by a bomb placed in his house by a Soviet partisan. He was succeeded by the SS and Police Leader, SS-Gruppenführer Curt von Gottberg (22 September 1943 – 1 August 1944).
SS and Police Leader: SS-Gruppenführer Jakob Sporrenberg (21 July – 14 August 1941); SS-Brigadeführer Carl Zenner (14 August 1941 – 22 May 1942); SS-Oberführer Karl Schäfer (22 May – 21 July 1942); SS-Gruppenführer Curt von Gottberg (21 July 1942 – 22 September 1943); SS-Standartenführer Erich Ehrlinger (22 September 1943 – 1 April 1944).

Holocaust 

Precise demographic data on the Jewish population of GkWR in August 1941 is not available, but it is likely there were over 300,000 Jews. Tens of thousands of Jewish refugees had arrived from central and western Poland in the fall of 1939, but many of them were deported to the Soviet interior before June 1941. A further unknown figure is the number of Jews who were evacuated or fled in time or were recruited into the Red Army. As an example, of the 70,998 Jews registered in Minsk in 1939, it is estimated that about 55,000 remained when the Germans invaded on 28 June 1941. By 1944, it is estimated that roughly 800,000 Byelorussian Jews, or about 90% of the Jewish population of Byelorussia, were murdered.

Following the German invasion, the Nazi death squads of Einsatzgruppe B immediately began the systematic murder of Jews. Following a massive wave of killings between mid-May and the end of July 1942, the Generalkommissar reported that in the 10 weeks, 55,000 Jews had been liquidated. Only in the districts of Baranowitsche and Hansewitschi were such large operations still to be conducted, especially in Baranowicze, where about 10,000 Jews remained. The escape of up to 20,000 Jews from the ghettos to the partisans forced the Germans to accelerate the liquidations of ghettos. By the spring of 1943, ghettos remained only in a few locations, including Minsk, Lida, Nowogródek, and Głębokie. In October 1943, the Minsk ghetto, the largest ghetto in the Nazi-occupied Soviet Union, was the last in GkWR to be liquidated, and nearly all of its nearly 100,000 detainees perished.

Dissolution 
On 29 June 1944, the Red Army launched the Minsk offensive and, on 3 July, Minsk fell. On 1 August, administration of those parts of Byelorussia still under German occupation reverted to military administration under Army Group Centre and Generalbezirk Weissruthenien effectively ceased to exist. Gottberg was transferred to the Waffen-SS to become commander of XII SS Corps.

See also 
 German occupation of Byelorussia during World War II
 The Holocaust in Belarus

References

Belarus in World War II
Reichskommissariat Ostland
States and territories disestablished in 1944
States and territories established in 1941
World War II occupied territories